The Institute of Criminology may refer to:

 Australian Institute of Criminology
 Cambridge Institute of Criminology, University of Cambridge
 Paris Institute of Criminology
 Institute of Criminology and Criminal Justice, Carleton University, Canada